Chandannagar, also known by its former name Chandernagore and French name Chandernagor, is a city in the Hooghly district in the Indian state of West Bengal. It is headquarter of the Chandannagore subdivision and is part of the area covered by the Kolkata Metropolitan Development Authority (KMDA).

Located on the western bank of Hooghly River, the city was one of the five settlements of French India. Indo-French architecture is seen in the colonial bungalows, most of which are in a dilapidated state.

Etymology 
The name Chandernagor is possibly derived from the shape of the bank of the river Hooghly which is bent like a half-moon (in Bengali, Chand means moon and Nagar implies city), so originally it was Chander Nagar. From the river bank, it looked like a moon-shaped necklace (crescent moon). Local tradition holds that the city was once the major hub of the trade of sandalwood (Bengali-chandan). One more possibility for the name is a temple of the goddess 'Chandi'. Earlier, the city was known as Farasdanga or "France dongi" as it was a French colony (Bengali: Faras means French, danga means land). The name Farasdanga appears in Bengali literature.

History

Chandannagar came into being during colonial times, proved conclusively by the fact that no mention of the town is found in medieval Bengali texts like Chandimangal and Manasamangal Kāvya. Historians are of the opinion that the French created the town by amalgamating various smaller localities in the area. The three notable villages to be incorporated were Gondolpara to the South, Boro in the North and Khalisani to the West. The name "Chandernagor" can be first found in the letter dated 1696, intended for the officials of the French East India Company, dispatched by André Boureau-Deslandes and Palle, French officials posted in Chandernagore.

The First Director of the French East India Company, Boureau-Deslandes paid 40,000 coins to the Mughal subahdar in 1688 to gain control of the area and build a factory there. But the first Frenchman to possess any subsequent land holding in this area was Du Plessis who bought land of 13 Arpents at Boro Kishanganj, now located at North Chandannagar for Taka 401 in the year 1673–74.

The prosperity of Chandannagar as a French colony started soon after. At this time the Company establishment consisted of 1 Director, and 5 members who formed a council, 15 merchants and shopkeepers, 2 notaries, 2 padres, 2 doctors and 1 Sutradhar. The army consisted of 130-foot soldiers, 20 among them were native Indians. The Fort d'Orleans was constructed in the year 1696-97 and was better defended than its French and British counterparts. After the initial success the French trade languished due to the lax policy of its Directors.

In 1730 Joseph François Dupleix was appointed governor of the city, during whose administration more than two thousand brick houses were erected in the town and a considerable maritime trade was carried on. The population of the city reached to be around a lakh (100,000) at this time and the fledgling town of Calcutta was considered to be a poor cousin of Chandannagar. From Dupleix's time to 1756, Chandannagar was the main center for European commerce in Bengal. The city had thriving centres of trade involving opium, indigo, silk, rice, rope, sugar, etc. The fine clothes of Chandannagar were exported to Europe.

One of the premier men of the town who made it big at this time was Indranarayan Chaudhari. He had arrived at the end of the seventeenth century from Jessore as an orphan sheltered at his maternal grandfather's house. He secured a job at the Company out of his own industriousness and then went on to gain a tremendous fortune being associated with the burgeoning trade of the company. When the East India Company seized his house after the siege of 1756, cash and jewellery worth 65 lakhs was secured from his house alone. Nandadulal Temple, a temple to Krishna established by him still houses the secret chamber in which he reportedly hid his immense fortune which was later recovered by British general Robert Clive. Maharaj Krishna Chandra of Krishnanagar would often come to him to lend money.

In 1756 war broke out between France and Great Britain, and Colonel Robert Clive of the British East India Company and Admiral Charles Watson of the British Navy bombarded and captured Chandannagar on 23 March 1757. The town's fortifications and many houses were demolished thereafter, and Chandannagar's importance as a commercial center was eclipsed by that of Calcutta situated down river. Chandernagore was restored to the French in 1763, but retaken by the British in 1794 in the Napoleonic Wars. The city was returned to France in 1816, along with a   enclave of surrounding territory. It was governed as part of French India until 1950, under the political control of the governor-general in Pondicherry. By 1900 the town's former commercial importance was gone, and it was little more than a quiet suburb of Calcutta, with a population of 25,000 (1901). But it was noted for its clean wide thoroughfares, with many elegant residences along the riverbank.

Like the other three French-administered colonies of India, Chandernagore was under the jurisdiction of French-controlled Pondicherry. There was only one Governor for the entire French India. He resided in the principal city of Pondicherry, and from time to time, he would visit the other colonies. There was one Administrator under the Governor in each colony. Though there were courts and magistrates here, a separate judge used to come from Pondicherry for session trials. There was a High court in Pondicherry for filing an appeal. The Collectorates, the Education Department, the Housing Department, etc. were all under the said department of Pondicherry. One Inspector from France used to come here every year for inspecting all the affairs. The French Consul who lived in Calcutta had no connection with the administration of Chandernagore.

Formerly the government kept a troop of sepoys to help maintenance of peace in the town. It is known that Chandernagore had two divisions of infantry during 1743–45. Under the terms of the treaty it had no alternative but to keep not more than 15 soldiers.

The laws of this place were not specific, laws were the same in regard to all the French colonies and special decrees were drawn up by the Minister of the Interior of France. In the French parliamentary houses, among the Députés and Senators there was one representative elected by the citizens and representatives of French India in each house.

Though no Indian ever got a place in the French Parliament, the citizens of Chandernagore had the right to be elected to those seats.

A Municipality was created here on 1 August 1880. Charles Dumaine became the first Mayor.

There was a sworn-in post called Notaire like the Registrar of British India. All the deeds such as testaments and wills, sales and purchases, conveyances, debts and dues or prenuptial contracts were registered by him.

The judicial system even passed a few death sentences in the town. The first time this was carried out was on the 26th of January 1883: two persons named Sk. Abdul Panjari and Hiru Bagdi were sentenced to death. The guillotine was used to carry out capital punishment and was used in the town for the last time on 22 July 1895.

Merger with India

India became independent from Britain in 1947. In June 1948 the French Government held a plebiscite which found that 97% of Chandannagar's residents wished to become part of India. In May 1950, the French allowed the Indian government to assume de facto control over Chandannagar, officially ceding the city to India on 2 February 1951. De jure transfer took place on 9 June 1952. The inhabitants were given the option to retain French nationality, like their counterparts in Pondicherry.

On 2 October 1954 Chandannagar was integrated into the state of West Bengal.

Geography

Location

Chandannagar consisted of mainly three parts Khalisani (west), Gondalpara (south) and Boro (north). There are about 30 localities (para) and more than 100 sub-localities. Of them, some are Gondalpara, Nutan Telighat, Barasat, Tematha, Hatkhola, Daibokpara, Padripara, Lalbagan, Barabazar, Bagbazar, Fatokgora, Khalisani, Nabagram, Palpara, Urdibazar, Luxmigunj, Boro Panchanantala, Boro Champatala, Taldanga, Haridradanga etc. Bajra, Bandhagram etc. are some of the village-like areas near the borders of the city.

The city is bordered by Chinsurah in the north, Bhadreswar in the south, the Hooghly river in the east and Dhaniakhali in the west.

Police station
Chandannagar police station has jurisdiction over the Chandernagore Municipal Corporation area. Chandannagar Police Commissionerate was established on 30 June 2017. The establishments marked under the same are Chinsurah PS; Chandernagore PS; Bhadreswar PS; Serampore PS; Dankuni PS; Rishra PS; Uttarpara PS; Chinsurah Women PS; Serampore Women PS. Mr Peeyush Pandey, an IPS of 1993 batch, became the first commissioner of the Chandannagar Police Commissionerate. A major urban part of the district along river Hooghly has been brought under the jurisdiction of the commissionerate to ensure better policing.

Places of interest
Most of the city's numerous public and private buildings have a distinct Indo-French style of architecture, similar to that of Pondicherry (now called Pudducherry) and other former French enclaves in India. Most of these buildings are in a dilapidated state and in need of restoration.

Chandannagore Strand

It is a popular spot for local people and tourists alike, who love to stroll along enjoying the breeze and watching the small boats sail by. Along the Strand one can find the Vivekananda Mandir (a meditation centre protruding into the river Ganges).

Chandernagore Museum and Institute (Institut de Chandernagor)
The Chandernagore Museum was established in 1961. It boasts a collection of French antiques (such as cannons used in Anglo-French war, wooden furniture of the 18th century, etc.) which are difficult to find anywhere else in the world. The institute still teaches French through regular classes. Jogendra Nath Sen, resident of Chandannagar who died in France fighting in the World War I. His personal items were sent to his brother in India who later donated them to the Institut de Chandernagor in Chandannagar. The Museum is closed on Thursday and Saturday.

The Sacred Heart Church of Chandannagar (l'Eglise du Sacré Cœur)
The Sacred Heart Church, Chandannagar is situated near the Strand. It was designed by French Architect Jacques Duchatz. The church was inaugurated by Paul Goethals on 27 January 1884. The church stands for over two centuries to mark the beauty of the architecture during the French period – a good place to visit for the historians and tourists alike. The remains of the Church of St. Louis is also an attractive tourist spot.

French Cemetery
The French Cemetery contains 150 tombs and is located on Grand Trunk Road opposite Lal Dighi (a large lake). Amongst the remarkable people buried there, one can find the tomb of Duplessis, the founding father of French Chandannagar and also the one of pioneering meteorologist Henry "Storm" Piddington, who is mentioned in Amitav Ghosh's novel The Hungry Tide.

Chandanangar Gate
Constructed in 1937, to mark the Fall of Bastille, the gate has the slogan of the French Revolution "Liberté, égalité, fraternité (Liberty, equality fraternity)" etched on it.

The Underground House (Patal-Bari)
The building is another beautiful example of the advancement in the knowledge of architecture and the aesthetic sense of the people of those earlier days. Its lower floor is submerged during monsoon when the level of the river rises. Rabindranath Tagore frequently visited the place and appreciated a lot about the building. He felt that the place influenced him to a large extent and broadened his intellectual capabilities. He mentioned Patal-bari in many of his famous novels. The famous social reformer Iswar Chandra Vidyasagar also stayed in the building. The house was owned by the zamindars of nearby Mankundu.

Nandadulal Temple
Nandadulal Temple built in 1740 by Indranarayan Roychoudhury presents an excellent example of ancient Indian sculptures. There are many fascinating temples devoted to Kali, Shiva and other deities which show marks of brilliant craftsmanship and artistic taste. The temple's old idol of lord Krishna was thrown away into the pond behind the temple by a general. Later the pieces of the idols were fished out and submerged in varanasi. It is built in the do chalha style.

Nritya Gopal Smriti Mandir
Built by Harihar Sett, and donated to the people of Chandannagore. This building still serves as a theatre hall and a library. It was first of its kind in the entire locality. It has one of the largest collections of books in French, English and Bengali in the district.

Bishalakshmi temple
The temple is situated near Brahmin para, Boubazar in the western part of railway station. The history of this ancient temple is not known properly. The deity is worshiped regularly by the local people.

Sabinara Thakurbari
A temple of Lord Jaggannath, Lord of the universe. It is situated on 'Rather Sadak' or the road of Lord Jaggannath's chariot. Mahaprabhu Chaitanya is said to have visited this place in his time. Currently this temple is maintained by the Chattopadhyay family.

KMDA Park
The KMDA Park located West of Chandernagore Railway Station is a popular park and picnic spot. It was made open to the public in 2002 and since then it has served thousands of people who come here for picnics, particularly in the winter months.

The Mango Gardens
There mango gardens now privately owned and maintained are popular picnic spots situated west of the railway station near Mankundu. The Gardens have been operational since 2009, and several hundreds of people gather here for winter day outs. Few such gardens are named as Amrapali, Amrakunja.

Cultural Calendar of the City 
In the month of Shravan, Bhuvaneshwari Puja is held at Hatkhola for a month.

During the month of November, 10 days after Diwali, Jagaddhatri Puja is held citywide including the neighbouring towns of Bhadreswar and Mankundu. These idols are almost 3 times taller than the Durga Puja held in Kolkata. From Panchami till Dashami the whole region lights up, bedecked with lights of Chandernagore's local manufacturers. From Dashami night till the next dawn all the major puja committees bring their idols with a theme and line in the world's largest procession after Rio's Samba festival. Some of the oldest pujas here range from over 300 (Adi Maa) till 150 years.

Roads and transport
Private Bus number 2 (Chunchura Court - Dakshineswar) plies through Chandannagar along Grand Trunk Road. A newly built overbridge above the railway tracks makes easy to connect East and West parts of Chandannagar City. Taxis and private cars are easily available between Kolkata and Chandannagar.
 By Rail Chandannagar railway station serves the locality. Local trains from Howrah station on Howrah-Bardhaman main line of Eastern Railway run very frequently (peak frequency one train every 10 or 12 minutes). A few important express and passenger trains halt here. Many through trains (trains which will stop only at specific stations, primarily junctions) also tend to make stops here.

 By Bus Chandannagore is well connected by bus after lockdown period. Every day, two buses of West Bengal Transport Corporation leave from Esplanade Bus Stand for Chandannagar, one in the morning and the other in the evening. Apart from the WBTC buses, there are many other private buses that connects Kolkata and Chandannagar.

By Air 
 Nearest airport is in Kolkata (Dumdum/Kolkata Airport), which is linked with all major Indian and international cities. Chandannagore is only  by road from the airport.
 By Water Government of West Bengal (West Bengal Surface Transport Corporation) operates river services across Hooghly River (the Ganges) and also between Chandannagar and Kolkata and Belur.

Heritage and culture
Jagaddhatri Puja is a major socio-cultural event in this region, attracting massive crowds from all over the state of West Bengal.

History
The ancient history of Jagaddhatri Puja in Chandannagar is unknown even today. It is wrongly believed that Indranarayan Chowdhury introduced the Jagaddhatri Puja in Chandannagar in manners similar to Raja Krishnachandra of Krishnanagore. The time of beginning of Jagaddhatri Puja in Krishnanagore was 1762. Indranarayan Choudhury died in 1756. So Indranarayan Choudhury by no means introduced the Jagaddhatri puja in Chandannagar. The beginning of Jagaddhatri puja in Chandannagar probably dates back earlier than 1750. Indranarayan Choudhury performed the Jagaddhatri puja at his own house in Chandannagar, at the time Krishnachandra used to come to borrow money from Indranarayan Choudhury. The father of Krishnachandra had started the puja of Jagaddhatri at Krishna Nagar due to missing out once on the puja of Durga by being locked up in British prison. Once Krishnachandra's ship could not reach Krishna Nagar in time for Jagaddhatri puja due to weak winds. So he performed on day of navami the puja at the Ghat of Nichupatty. Seeing in this the wish of the Goddess to be established as a puja in Chandannagar too, he left funds for its yearly worship on a permanent basis.
In 1780 Bengal Gazette of James August Hickey was the first newspaper of this country. The newspaper was silent about the Jagaddhatri Puja. But the 'Friends of India' published a report on the community Jagaddhatri Puja in 1820. The date of the community Jagaddhatri Puja in Chandernagore was 1790. In those days Robert Clive called Lakhsmiganj of Chandernagore the 'Granary of Bengal'. The Jagaddhatri Puja at Chaulpatty (Rice Market) in Lakshmiganj is probably the historic example of the ancient community Jagaddhatri Puja. The Jagaddhatri Puja of Chandernagore bridges the past and the present.

One of the main attractions of the Jagaddhatri idol of Chandernagore is the ornamental decoration of the goddess with sola and the beautiful canvas of mats with paintings at the back of the image. Also the procession is second longest in the world after Rio de Janeiro's.

Education

List of boys' schools

 Sri Aurobindo Vidyamandir
 Pearl Rosary School (WBBSE, WBCHSE)
 Adarsa Shikshalaya (WBBSE, WBCHSE)
 Chandernagore Kanailal Vidyamandir( Eng. Sec.) (WBBSE, WBCHSE)
 Chandernagore Kanailal Vidyamandir( Fr. Sec.)  (WBBSE)
 Durga Charan Rakshit Banga Vidyalaya (WBBSE, WBCHSE)
 Prabartak Vidyarthi Bhaban (WBBSE)
 Ganges Gurukul (Coed) (ICSE + ISC)
 Khalisani Vidya Mandir (WBBSE)
 Narua Siksha Niketan (WBBSE)
 Modern Public School, Bhakunda (co ed)
 Chandannagar St. Paul's
 Rishi Aurobindo Bal-Kendram, Vidyalanka (Co-Ed)
 Vivekanand Wisdom Mission (Co-ED)
Chandannagar Banga Vidyalaya (WBBSE, WBCHSE)
Nritya Gopal Model High School (WBBSE)

List of girls' schools
 St. Joseph Convent
 Krishna Bhabini Nari Shiksha Mandir (WBBSE, WBCHSE)
 St. Anthony's High School (WBBSE, WBCHSE)
 Lal Bagan Balika Vidyalaya (WBBSE)
 Ushangini Balika Vidyalaya (WBBSE, WBCHSE)
 Prabartak Nari Mandir (WBBSE)
 Indumati Girls High School (WBBSE)
 Khalisani Nari Siksha Mandir (WBBSE)
 Ganges Gurukul (Coed)(ICSE + ISC)
 Bholanath Das Balika Vidyalaya
 Modern Public School, Bhakunda (co ed)
 Rishi Aurobindo Bal-Kendram, Vidyalanka (Co-Ed)

List of famous art school
Rong O Tuli

This famous Art school running for the last 60 years. This is one of the most famous Art school in town.founder sunil chatterjee

Art Club of Chandannagar

This organisation famous for organising Art and Craft Exhibition every year along with Workshop and Puja Parikrama since
2002.

List of colleges
 Chandernagore Government College (University of Burdwan)
 Khalisani Mahavidyalaya (University of Burdwan)
 Institute of Education (P.G.) for Women, Chandannagar (University of Burdwan)
 Women's Polytechnic College
 Sir J. C. Bose School of Engineering, Mankundu

Gallery

Demographics
As per 2011 Census of India Chandannagar had a total population of 166,867 of which 84,009 (50.3%) were males and 82,858 (49.7%) were females. Population below 6 years was 11,826. The total number of literates in Chandannagar was 139,005 (89.65% of the population over 6 years).

Notable residents
 Radhanath Sikdar, Indian mathematician, best known for calculating the height of Mount Everest.
 Kanailal Dutta, Bengali revolutionary and martyr.
 Rash Behari Bose, Bengali revolutionary.
 Motilal Roy, Bengali revolutionary, journalist, spiritual leader.
 Shrish Chandra Ghosh, Bengali revolutionary
 Manindra Nath Nayak, Bengali revolutionary
 Basabi Pal, Professor of French
 Tapas Paul, Bengali actor and Member of Parliament.
 Ishan Porel, Indian Under-19 and Bengal(CAB) cricketer
 Upendranath Bandyopadhyay, Indian writer.

Cuisine 
Chandannagar is famous for its own popular  Jolbhora Talsash Sondesh.

See also
Municipal Administration in French India

References

9. Archival Papers on Merger with India [Chandannagar Heritage Archive]
10. Old Photos of Chandannagar [Chandannagar Heritage Archive]
11. Old Map [Chandannagar Heritage Archive]

Further reading

Discover Chandannagar/author - Kalyan Chakrabortty[Published by Chandernagor Heritage]/
CHANDERNAGOR-Edited by Lipika Ghosh and Kalyan Chakrabortty/Published by Chandernagor Heritage=
CHANDANNAGORER KATHA/Author - Lipika Ghosh [Published by Chandernagor Heritage]/
Sankhipta Chandannagar Parichay/Author - Harihar Sett [Published by Chandannagar Pustakagar]
"Ami Tomaderi Rash Behari"/Author-Kalyan Chakrabortty

External links

300 years of Chandannagar (1696-1996)
 Geocities site about Chandannagar
Institut de Chandernagore - official website
Indian Ministry for External Affairs - 1951 Treaty of Cession
La présence française à Chandernagor (1688-1950) 
East Meets West by A. Chatterji
 
Yahoo! Education page on Chandannagar
Stereotype photo (poverty etc) Gallery of Chandannagar on TrekEarth
Chandannagar Information
Temples of Chandannagar
Jagadhatri Puja images
Heritage Chandernagore

 
Cities and towns in Hooghly district
French India
Neighbourhoods in Kolkata
Kolkata Metropolitan Area
Populated places established in 1673
1673 establishments in the French colonial empire
1757 disestablishments in the French colonial empire
1757 establishments in the British Empire
1763 disestablishments in the British Empire
1763 establishments in the French colonial empire
1794 disestablishments in the French colonial empire
1794 establishments in the British Empire
1816 disestablishments in the British Empire
1816 establishments in French India
1951 disestablishments in French India
1951 establishments in West Bengal
Tourist attractions in Hooghly district
Cities in West Bengal